Heer and Ranjha's tomb is a tomb said to be of Heer Syal and Dheedo Ranjha, situated in Jhang, Pakistan. Heer and Ranjha is one of several popular romantic works of folklore from the Indian subcontinent. There are several poetic narrations of the tragic story, the most famous being Heer by Waris Shah written in 1766. Jhang was Heer's home, therefore they were buried here. Every year during Muharram the Urs is held at the tomb.

History
The exact time period of Heer and Ranjha's life is not known, however it is  assumed that they lived during fifteenth century in Punjab in modern day Pakistan. The plaque at the tomb mentions 876 AH, as year of their death, which corresponds to 1471 AD. An exact date of tomb's construction is not known, it is believed that the tomb was constructed some time after their death.

Architecture

The tomb is built in Islamic architectural style and features a dome and small turrets at the four corners. The dome reaches little more than a foot above the spring of the arch and features a cupola in its roof. Both Heer and Ranjah are buried in a single grave inside the tomb. The grave is decorated with tiles and is marked by a marble tombstone.

Location
The tomb is located in Jhang city in Punjab, Pakistan near Faisalabad road and Railway line. It is also close to Mai Heer ground and Nawaz Sharif stadium and the new sport complex.

See also
Mirza Sahiba
Sohni Mahiwal
Laila Majnu

References

Islamic architecture
Tombs in Pakistan
Jhang District